Marie Jacques Noël Pardon (4 June 1854 – 12 July 1910) was a French colonial administrator. 
He served in Cochinchina, New Caledonia, and as Governor of Guadeloupe and Martinique.
After leaving the colonial service he was involved in various private enterprises to develop the colonies.

Career

Early years (1854–89)

Noël Pardon was born on 4 June 1854 in Chalon-sur-Saône.
He became a Doctor of Law and a colonial administrator.

Noël Pardon was appointed secretary general of the prefecture of the Loire.
In 1886 he was appointed Director of the Interior of Cochinchina.
He was Acting Governor of Cochinchina from October to November 1887.

New Caledonia (1889–91)

Pardon was Acting Governor of New Caledonia from 1889 to 1891.
He arrived in New Caledonia early in 1889.
He was concerned about the shortage of agricultural laborers, and about the lack of supervision of workers hired privately.
He supported the official resumption of indentured servitude as long as recruitment was regulated, as demanded by the General Council, an advisory body that represented the free citizens of the colony.
In 1890 Pardon submitted a proposal for land reform in New Caledonia to the Extra-Parliamentary Committee of the Cadastre.
He wanted to apply the Torrens title system in the colony, which would allow for the appropriation and sale of lands to private individuals, with the profit used to cover the colony's costs.
There would be no difficulty with indigenous legislation, since there was none, unlike the complications that arose in more advanced countries such as Tunisia.

In 1893 Pardon ran unsuccessfully for election to the legislature for Firminy, Loire.

Guadeloupe (1894–95)

Pardon was governor of Guadeloupe from 1894 to 1895.
He gave a detail report in the island's economy in 1894 to the Minister of the Colonies, concluding that "politics must be held responsible for the poor finances."
Workers in Guadeloupe had been receiving steadily lower wages over the last decade, while prices had been rising in part due to the Méline tariff and in part to the bank's manipulation of the exchange rate between the Guadeloupe franc and the French franc.
He wrote to the Minister of the Colonie on 20 April 1895 that the workers live "exclusively on factory wages, buy everything and do not have, at least in wide stretches of this land, a manioc, sweet potato plant, or a breadfruit tree."
Their supposed representatives in parliament had little interest in helping the workers.

Pardon blamed the sugar crisis in the island on poor decisions by past colonial officials and the industry leaders, who had failed to diversify into other industries.
However, he did not have a good alternative. 
By continuing to support the industry the administration was supporting sugar planters and manufacturers who were typically opposed to the Republic, but failure to support it would cause economic crisis and push workers towards socialism and revolutionary politics.

Martinique (1895–98)

In June 1895 Delphino Moracchini was transferred to become Governor of Guadeloupe.
He exchanged places with Pardon, who became governor of Martinique.
In a letter of 30 January 1896 to the Minister of the Marine and the Colonies Pardon mentioned several outbreaks of typhoid and yellow fever.
In August 1896 Pardon confirmed that two patients had died of yellow fever in Fort-de-France that month, while two suspected cases had been isolated and expected to live.
The outbreak seemed to have been contained.
In 1897 he was placed on leave without pay.
On 12 July 1898 Pardon was replaced as Governor of Martinique by Marie Louis Gustave Gabrié.

Company director (1898–1910)

In September 1898 the Écho des mines et de la métallurgie announced that the Société industrielle et commerciale du Soudan français (Industrial and Commercial Society of the French Sudan) had been founded with a capital of 1,400,000 francs.
Noël Pardon was listed first among the directors.
He was also a director of the industrial and commercial company of Indo-China.
Pardon was president of a delegation to support opening the interior of the African colonies that addressed a memorandum on 5 February 1900 to the Colonial Minister noting the usefulness of territorial concessions for development of settlements.
In 1904 he went on a mission to the United States on behalf of the Wyoming Union.
That year he was counsel in New Caledonia of the International Nickel Company. 
Pardon died on 12 July 1910 aboard the Oxus, on which he had embarked in Madagascar.

Publications

Publication by Noël Pardon include:

Notes

Sources

1854 births
1910 deaths
Governors of Cochinchina